Marc Anton Johnson (born June 20, 1948) is an American agricultural economist and academic administrator. He became the 16th president of the University of Nevada, Reno on April 16, 2011 after his predecessor Milton Glick died while in office.

Early life and education
Johnson was raised on a family farm near Wichita, Kansas. He earned a bachelor's degree in Biology from Emporia State University, Master of Technology in International Development from North Carolina State University, Master of Economics from Michigan State University, and a Ph.D. in Agricultural Economics from Michigan State University.

Career
Johnson served as dean of the Colorado State University College of Agricultural Sciences and Kansas State University College of Agriculture. Johnson joined the faculty of the University of Nevada, Reno in June 2008 as vice president and provost.

On October 31, 2019, it was announced that Johnson step down as president on June 30, 2020 and transition to a position in the UNR College of Business. However, it was delayed until Brian Sandoval succeeded him as president on October 5, 2020.

References

1948 births
Living people
American Lutherans
Colorado State University faculty
Emporia State University alumni
Michigan State University alumni
Nevada Independents
North Carolina State University alumni
People from Wichita, Kansas
University of Nevada, Reno faculty